The Capay Hills are a low mountain range of the Inner Northern California Coast Ranges System, in Yolo County, California.

They are located on the western side of the Sacramento Valley.

The Capay Valley and Capay Valley AVA are west of the hills.

References 

Hills of California
Mountain ranges of Yolo County, California
California Coast Ranges
Geography of the Sacramento Valley
Mountain ranges of Northern California